Lucie Daouphars (1922-1963) was a French fashion model known as Lucky, who worked extensively for Christian Dior and Jacques Fath. Lucky was Dior's favourite model.

References

1922 births
1963 deaths
French female models
Dior people
20th-century French women